The Italian Cross Country Championships is an annual cross country running competition that serves as Italy's national championship for the sport. It is usually held in February or March. It was first held in 1908 and featured a men's long course race only. A women's race was added to the programme in 1926.

The event includes separate races for both sexes across four categories: open (senior), under-23, under-20, and under-18. Short races were held for men and women from 1998 to 2006 (coinciding with the period that it was an official distance at the IAAF World Cross Country Championships). Short course champions were also elected in 1970 and 1971, but in no other years. Two championship races were held in 1925: one by FISA on 8 March and another by rival organisation UISA one week later.

The location of the championships varies from year to year and it has previously been incorporated into high level international races, such as the Cinque Mulini and Cross della Vallagarina.

Editions
In 2020, due to the COVID-19 pandemic, its were canceled twice. A first time in Campi Bisenzio in March and second in November in Trieste.

Senior long race
Key:

Short race

The 2001 race was won by Englishwoman Catherine Berry in 14:09, though she was not eligible for the national championship.

See also
Italian Athletics Championships

References

List of winners
National Crosscountry Champions for Italy. Association of Road Racing Statisticians (2016-04-28). Retrieved on 2016-09-09.

External links
Italian Athletics Federation website

Athletics competitions in Italy
National cross country running competitions
Annual sporting events in Italy
Recurring sporting events established in 1908
1908 establishments in Italy
Cross